The Al Mansour Hotel (Arabic, فندق المنصور) is situated on the bank of the Tigris river in the center of Baghdad. It was built in 1980 as the Al-Mansour Melia Hotel, part of the Spanish Melia hotel chain. In 2007, the hotel experienced bombings resulting in 12 deaths.

References

Hotels in Iraq
Buildings and structures in Baghdad
Hotels established in 1980
Hotel buildings completed in 1980
1980 establishments in Iraq